Heavy Pendulum is the seventh studio album by American rock band Cave In, released on May 20, 2022 through Relapse Records. This is the band's first album with bassist/backing vocalist Nate Newton, though late bassist/vocalist Caleb Scofield still has a presence on the record.

Background
In July 2021, Cave In signed to Relapse Records and announced its seventh studio album will be released through the label. The album's title was revealed as Heavy Pendulum with the release of the single "New Reality" on March 15, 2022. The album's second single, "Blinded by a Blaze", was released on April 5. The album's third single, "Blood Spiller", was released on April 26. The fourth single, "Reckoning", was released on May 10; the song was written entirely by guitarist Adam McGrath.

The album was produced by Converge guitarist Kurt Ballou, who produced Cave In's debut Until Your Heart Stops.

"New Reality" features a riff that was written by late bassist/vocalist Caleb Scofield in 2011. Additionally, "Amaranthine" features lyrics that were written by Scofield.

Musical style and lyrical themes
Revolver described lead single and opening track "New Reality" as leaning "into the quartet's sludgier inclinations." Jon Hadusek from Consequence referred to the song's riff as "heavy sludge and stoner metal." Second single, "Blinded by a Blaze", has been described as post-metal.

Nicholas Senior of New Noise Magazine described the album as stoner metal, comparing it to Red Fang. Additionally, the album has been noted has having a strong grunge influence.

"Blood Spiller" was written in response to several events that occurred in 2020. Frontman Stephen Brodsky stated:

If you laid out the timeline for 2020 like a recipe, it might look something like this: global pandemic + lockdowns + worldwide protests over the wrongful death of George Floyd + election year = cocktail for end times. Somewhere in that concoction, we found ingredients for a new Cave In album. Blood Spiller is the sound of us swallowing it, getting ripped on the horrors within, and coming down to reflect on it through song.

Track listing

Personnel
Cave In
Stephen Brodsky – lead vocals, lead guitar
Adam McGrath – rhythm guitar, backing vocals, lead vocals on "Reckoning"
Nate Newton – bass, backing vocals, tambourine
John-Robert Conners – drums

Production
Kurt Ballou – production, mixing
Zach Weeks – assistant producer, additional mixing
Richey Beckett – artwork

Charts

References

2022 albums
Cave In albums
Relapse Records albums
Albums produced by Kurt Ballou